Thomas Seltzer (born 27 July 1969 in Hamar, Norway) is a musician in the band Turbonegro, a television talk show host and documentary creator, and an author.

Personal life 
Seltzer was born to an American father and a Norwegian mother. Although he was born in Norway and has lived in Norway since his early childhood, Seltzer retains his U.S. citizenship and has never been a citizen of Norway de jure. Seltzer applied for Norwegian citizenship in 2016, but got rejected due to Norwegian laws prohibiting multiple citizenship. The Seltzer family hails originally from Midland, Texas in the United States, but together with his five-year-older brother he grew up in Superior, Wisconsin. At six, in 1975, he moved to Nesodden in Akershus, Norway.  While growing up in Norway, Seltzer took up skateboarding, an activity deemed so illegal by Norwegian authorities that in 1984, Seltzer (age 15) said he "smuggled in [his] board from England."

Seltzer currently lives in Oslo where he works as a talk show host and documentarist for the public Norwegian national television channel NRK.

Musical career 
Seltzer is the bassist (originally drummer) and main songwriter for the band Turbonegro. He is famous for wearing feminine makeup and a sailor's uniform. He has also gone under the names "Tom of Norway" and "Bongo". He has also played in the bands Akutt Innleggelse, The Vikings, Oslo Motherfuckers, and Scum.

Documentary and book about the United States 
Seltzer's documentary UXA – Thomas Seltzers Amerika shows him travelling through the United States to examine the state of the American Dream today. The first season, which aired on NRK in 2020, won the prize for the best documentary in Gullruten 2021. The second season aired in 2022.

In 2022 he published the book Amerikansk Karmageddon: Tanker om mitt fordømte fedreland, which translates to American Karmageddon: Thoughts about my damned fatherland. The book addresses the same topic as the documentary series: the decline of the United States. It is more auto-biographical than the documentary series, and the language is more informal than most non-fiction books. Many reviewers have praised the book, describing it as "a powerful achievement", well-referenced and convincing despite its informal style, and a successful combination of personal stories with broad cultural analysis. However, Aftenposten's reviewer called it untrustworthy and a "pop-intellectual bulldozer".

Trivia 
His enkeltpersonforetak is named Menneskekjøtt Engros, translating to Human Meat Wholesale Inc. This was intended as a joke to see whether extreme names for businesses would be approved, and he has kept the name.

References 

1969 births
Living people
Norwegian bass guitarists
Norwegian male bass guitarists
20th-century Norwegian drummers
21st-century Norwegian drummers
Norwegian rock drummers
Male drummers
Turbonegro members
People from Nesodden
Norwegian multi-instrumentalists
American people of Norwegian descent
Norwegian people of American descent
20th-century guitarists
21st-century Norwegian guitarists
20th-century drummers